This is a list of awards nominated and won by Hong Kong actor and singer, Ron Ng.

2004

2005

2006

2007

2008

2009

References

Ng, Ron
Cantopop